Begslist, Inc. is an Internet begging and online donation website. It is the online version of traditional begging or panhandling via the Internet and a way for people to get help with their financial problems through begging online, a practice known as "cyberbegging" or "digital panhandling". Begslist allows visitors to post their pleas for help on the website in the hopes to receive donations. PayPal buttons are added to each of the postings for readers to send donations to those asking for help through secured payments and money transfers through the Internet. On October 19, 2010 Begslist.org launched a new website redesign that incorporated social media sharing for users of the site.

History
Begslist.org was founded in 2007 by Rex Camposagrado and was originally started as a blog called begslist.blogspot.com. He created the site to help people who wanted to ask for help by getting donations anonymously; avoiding the embarrassment of having to beg in person or for those trying to find another alternative avenue to finding help any way they could. Camposagrado created Begslist after losing his business and he fell on hard times. He never saw himself as the kind of person to beg for help, but decided to seek help online due to his financial crunch. He attempted online begging, but had a bad experience begging online. Some sites charged him money — which he says didn't make sense — since that's what he needed. Amidst the slew of online begging sites Begslist.org costs nothing for cyber beggars to sign up and post their pleas for donations. The hope is to be found by one of the kind souls who scour the internet looking to give their cash away or receive offers of some kind of assistance. Whilst other sites often charge a hefty sign up fee Begslist.org is still free, as its creator knows what hard times are. Instead of the beggars paying to post, Begslist runs paid advertisements from businesses which include free credit reports, pay day loan lenders and credit repair services that help pay for the operation and hosting fees for the website. Virtually all begging sites include a disclaimer that warns of potential scams. Begslist, for example, tells users to avoid people who offer help but solicit money first; it also cautions against disclosing contact information. Camposagrado attempts to monitor the Web site for scams and warns people to be careful. The funny stories, he said, often get a better response than sad ones.

Beginning as a single web site, Begslist.org has since expanded and now also publishes additional begging Web sites such as Cyberbegging.org and Scamslist.com. In addition to cyberbegging and online donations, Begslist.org also offers links to free help and resources to help those in need get back on their feet.

Affiliates

Begslist.Blogspot.com
Begslist was originally a blog called begslist.blogspot.com. It still exists, but instead of pleas for help, it is mostly related to articles about the homeless, charities, resources to get help and donation news.

Cyberbegging.org

Cyberbegging.org is a charity and online begging news website.

Scamslist.com

With free access to the Internet from computer terminals in libraries and shelters, homeless and destitute people in crisis do post requests for critical needs. Begslist has hundreds of stories about people trying to escape abusive relationships, climb out of debt, pay their rent, feed their families and care for sick children. Other ask for warm clothes or toys for Christmas. The issues are serious, and the needs are real. However, the opportunity for fraud is just as real. Begslist offers the disclaimer, "Begslist cannot guarantee that any beggar is legitimate and make (sic) no claim that they are."

Launched on April 21, 2011, Scamslist.com is a site that is designed to protect the Begslist and online community by allowing users to report any scam, fraud, complaint or review on any type of company, individual, service or product on ScamsList.". Scamslist.com allows users to warn others about online scams, emails or post tips on how to avoid scams and frauds.

See also
Begging
Save Karyn

References

External links
The current site
The original site

American fundraising websites
Internet properties established in 2007
Internet begging